Walter Jamieson (21 July 1828 – 28 December 1881) was an Australian cricketer. He played two first-class matches for Tasmania in 1858.

See also
 List of Tasmanian representative cricketers

References

External links
 

1828 births
1881 deaths
Australian cricketers
Tasmania cricketers
Cricketers from Tasmania